Side Pocket is a 1986 pocket billiards video game.

Side Pocket may also refer to:

 a side pocket on a Billiard table
 a mechanism in a Hedge fund to compartmentalize certain assets 
 Side Pocket for a Toad, a beer by Tring Brewery
 Side pocket mandrel, containing a side pocket, used in oil and gas well completion
 "Side Pocket", a 1968 episode of Ironside
 "Side Pocket", a song from the 1970 film They Call Me Mister Tibbs!

See also
Pocket, a receptacle in clothing to hold small items